The Siemens-Halske Sh 22 (also known as SAM 22) was a nine-cylinder aircraft radial engine manufactured by Siemens & Halske in Germany in the 1930s. Following the reorganization of its manufacturer and change in military nomenclature, the engine became known as the Bramo 322.

It was a result of a series of modifications to the original Bristol Jupiter IV design, which Siemens licensed in 1929. The first modifications were to "Germanize" the dimensions, producing the Sh.20 and Sh.21. The design was then bored out to produce the 950 hp (708 kW) Sh.22 in 1930. Like the Jupiter, the Sh.22 featured a rather "old" looking arrangement with rather prominent valve pushrods on the front of the engine. In the mid-1930s the Reich Air Ministry (RLM) rationalized engine naming, and Bramo was given the 300-block of numbers, the Sh.14 and Sh.22 becoming the Bramo 314 and 322 respectively. The 322 never matured and remained unreliable. It became a base for the more successful Bramo 323.

Applications
Dornier Do 19 (proposed)
Fieseler Fi 98
Heinkel He 46
Henschel Hs 122
Junkers W 34
Junkers Ju 86ab1 prototype

Specifications (Bramo 322H-2)

References

Aircraft air-cooled radial piston engines
Siemens-Halske aircraft engines
1930s aircraft piston engines